John Howard Davis (born March 23, 1944) is an Emmy award-winning American television producer and presenter who works for Maryland Public Television out of Owings Mills, Maryland. He is best known for being the host of the weekly PBS series MotorWeek, which he created for the network in 1981, where he has served as the senior executive producer and host since its inception. Davis is a graduate of North Carolina State University, with a BS in mechanical and aerospace engineering, and earned a master's degree from The University of North Carolina in business administration.

In addition to his work on MotorWeek, Davis was also producer of the long running Wall Street Week during the era where Louis Rukeyser hosted. He has been with Maryland Public Television since the early 1970s.

References

1944 births
Living people
American male journalists
American television hosts